Liz Beatrice Lightstone (born March 1959) is a British physician and consultant who is a Professor of Nephrology at Imperial College London. Her research considers lupus nephritis, glomerular disease and chronic kidney disease. Lighthouse has also investigated healthcare inequalities.

Early life and education 
Lightstone completed her undergraduate studies in medicine at the University of Cambridge. She moved to King's College London for her clinical studies, and was one of the University of London's top candidates in her Bachelor of Medicine, Bachelor of Surgery. Lightstone was a clinical fellow at Guy's Hospital and Hammersmith Hospital, where she specialised in renal medicine. At the time, there were no woman consultants of nephrology in England. She joined the University College London Cancer Research Fund, where she researched murine T-cell subsets. After earning her doctorate in 1993, Lightstone moved to the Hammersmith Hospital as an Medical Research Council Clinical Fellow.

Research and career 
Lightstone was appointed a Clinical Lecturer in Nephrology in 1995. Her research has considered lupus nephritis and the development of new therapeutics. She served as Chief Investigator on the RITUXILUP trial, which involved a rituximab treatment regimen. The regimen involved sequential intravenous doses of rituximab and methylprednisolone, and was shown to be a safe and efficatious protocol. She has explored other therapeutics, including voclosporin and belimumab. Alongside development new treatment strategies, Lightstone searched for urine biomarkers that could be indicative of the outcome of lupus nephritis. Lighthouse has written the clinical guidelines on the management of lupus nephritis in adults and the management of pregnancy in women with lupus. Alongside rituximab, Lighthouse investigated glomerulonephritis and chronic kidney disease, and how health inequalities are experienced by people of colour.

During the COVID-19 pandemic, Lightstone focused how how to treat COVID-19 patients with kidney disease. She was Chair of the Central and North West London NHS Foundation Trust Treatment and Guideline Group. She explained that patients on dialysis had a very high infection rate, which she attributed to their frequent hospital visits. Her work was recognised with a Queen's Anniversary Prize for COVID-19 Response.

Selected publications

Personal life 
Lightstone has served as President of the Jewish Medical Association.

References 

1959 births
Living people
British women medical doctors
20th-century British medical doctors
21st-century British medical doctors
20th-century women physicians
21st-century women physicians
Alumni of the University of Cambridge
Alumni of King's College London
Alumni of the University of London
Academics of Imperial College London
British nephrologists